William Thomas Chambers (10 August 1906 – 1978) was an English-born association footballer who played as an inside forward. He played for a number of Football League and non-league clubs in the 1920s and 1930s, and enjoyed notable spells with Halifax Town and Chester.

He holds the Halifax Town record for most goals scored in a game, netting six in a Football League Division Three North match against Hartlepools United in April 1934.

References

Sportspeople from Wednesbury
Association football inside forwards
West Bromwich Albion F.C. players
Wednesbury Town F.C. players
Worcester City F.C. players
Shrewsbury Town F.C. players
Burnley F.C. players
Halifax Town A.F.C. players
Bolton Wanderers F.C. players
Oldham Athletic A.F.C. players
Chester City F.C. players
Bath City F.C. players
English Football League players
1906 births
1978 deaths
Darlaston Town F.C. players
Lovell's Athletic F.C. players
English footballers